The California State Water Project, commonly known as the SWP, is a state water management project in the U.S. state of California under the supervision of the California Department of Water Resources. The SWP is one of the largest public water and power utilities in the world, providing drinking water for more than 27 million people and generating an average of 6,500 GWh of hydroelectricity annually. However, as it is the largest single consumer of power in the state itself, it has a net usage of 5,100 GWh.

The SWP collects water from rivers in Northern California and redistributes it to the water-scarce but populous cities through a network of aqueducts, pumping stations and power plants. About 70% of the water provided by the project is used for urban areas and industry in Southern California and the San Francisco Bay Area, and 30% is used for irrigation in the Central Valley. The SWP shares many facilities with the federal Central Valley Project (CVP), which primarily serves agricultural users. Water can be interchanged between SWP and CVP canals as needed to meet peak requirements for project constituents. The SWP provides estimated annual benefits of $400 billion to California's economy.

Environmental concerns caused by the dry-season removal of water from the Sacramento–San Joaquin River Delta, a sensitive estuary region, have often led to further reductions in water delivery. Work continues today to expand the SWP's water delivery capacity while finding solutions for the environmental impacts of water diversion.

History
The original purpose of the project was to provide water for arid Southern California, whose local water resources and share of the Colorado River were insufficient to sustain the region's growth. The SWP was rooted in two proposals. The United Western Investigation of 1951, a study by the U.S. Bureau of Reclamation, assessed the feasibility of interbasin water transfers in the Western United States. In California, this plan contemplated the construction of dams on rivers draining to California's North Coast – the wild and undammed Klamath, Eel, Mad and Smith River systems – and tunnels to carry the impounded water to the Sacramento River system, where it could be diverted southwards. In the same year, State Engineer A.D. Edmonston proposed the Feather River Project, which proposed the damming of the Feather River, a tributary of the Sacramento River, for the same purpose. The Feather River was much more accessible than the North Coast rivers, but did not have nearly as much water. Under both of the plans, a series of canals and pumps would carry the water south through the Central Valley to the foot of the Tehachapi Mountains, where it would pass through the Tehachapi Tunnel to reach Southern California.

Calls for a comprehensive statewide water management system (complementing the extensive, but primarily irrigation-based Central Valley Project) led to the creation of the California Department of Water Resources in 1956. The following year, the preliminary studies were compiled into the extensive California Water Plan, or Bulletin No. 3. The project was intended for "the control, protection, conservation, distribution, and utilization of the waters of California, to meet present and future needs for all beneficial uses and purposes in all areas of the state to the maximum feasible extent." California governor Pat Brown would later say it was to "correct an accident of people and geography".

The diversion of the North Coast rivers was abandoned in the plan's early stages after strong opposition from locals and concerns about the potential impact on the salmon in North Coast rivers. The California Water Plan would have to go ahead with the development of the Feather River alone, as proposed by Edmonston. The Burns-Porter Act of 1959 provided $1.75 billion of initial funding through a bond measure. Construction on Stage I of the project, which would deliver the first  of water, began in 1960. Northern Californians opposed the measure as a boondoggle and an attempt to steal their water resources. In fact, the city of Los Angeles – which was to be one of the principal beneficiaries – also opposed the project; locals saw it as a ploy by politicians in the other Colorado River basin states to get Los Angeles to relinquish its share of the Colorado River. Historians largely attribute the success of the Burns-Porter Act and the State Water Project to major agribusiness lobbying, particularly by J.G. Boswell II of the J.G. Boswell cotton company. The bond was passed on an extremely narrow margin of 174,000 out of 5.8 million ballots cast.

In 1961, ground was broken on Oroville Dam, and in 1963, work began on the California Aqueduct and San Luis Reservoir. The first deliveries to the Bay Area were made in 1962, and water reached the San Joaquin Valley by 1968. Due to concerns over the fault-ridden geography of the Tehachapi Mountains, the tunnel plan was scrapped; the water would have to be pumped over the mountains'  crest. In 1973, the pumps and the East and West branches of the aqueduct were completed, and the first water was delivered to Southern California. A Peripheral Canal, which would have carried SWP water around the vulnerable and ecologically sensitive Sacramento–San Joaquin River Delta, was rejected in 1982 due to environmental concerns. The Coastal Branch, which delivers water to coastal central California, was completed in 1997.

Project description

Feather River facilities

The Feather River, a tributary of the Sacramento River, provides the primary watershed for the State Water Project. Runoff from the Feather River headwaters is captured in Antelope, Frenchman, and Davis reservoirs, which impound tributaries of the North and Middle forks of the Feather River.

Water released from the Upper Feather River system flows into Lake Oroville, which is formed by the Oroville Dam several miles above the city of Oroville. At , Oroville is the tallest dam in the United States; by volume it is the largest dam in California. Authorized by an emergency flood control measure in 1957, Oroville Dam was built between 1961 and 1967 with the reservoir filling for the first time in 1968. 

Water stored in Lake Oroville is released through the 819 MW Edward Hyatt pumped-storage powerplant and two other hydroelectric plants downstream of Oroville Dam, which together make up the Oroville-Thermalito Complex. The Thermalito Forebay and Afterbay support the 120 MW Thermalito Pumping-Generating Plant, and the Thermalito Diversion Dam supports a smaller 3.3 MW powerplant. The entire system generates approximately 2.2 billion kilowatt hours per year, making up about a third of the total power generated by SWP facilities.

Delta facilities
From Oroville, a regulated water flow travels down the Feather and Sacramento Rivers to the Sacramento–San Joaquin River Delta. The aqueduct delivers water to clients in Napa and Solano counties.

The vast majority of the SWP water is drawn through the Delta's complex estuary system into the Clifton Court Forebay, located northwest of Tracy on the southern end of the Delta. Here, the Harvey O. Banks Pumping Plant lifts water  into the California Aqueduct.

From here the water flows briefly south along the California Aqueduct to the  Bethany Reservoir. The South Bay Pumping Plant supplies the South Bay Aqueduct, which has delivered water west to Alameda County since 1962 and Santa Clara County since 1965.

California Aqueduct

The aqueduct enters the O'Neill Forebay reservoir west of Volta, where water can be pumped into a giant offstream storage facility, San Luis Reservoir, formed by the nearby B.F. Sisk Dam. San Luis Reservoir is shared by the SWP and the federal Central Valley Project; here water can be switched between the California Aqueduct and Delta-Mendota Canal to cope with fluctuating demands.

South of the San Luis Reservoir complex, the aqueduct steadily gains elevation through a series of massive pumping plants. Dos Amigos Pumping Plant is located shortly south of San Luis, lifting the water . Near Kettleman City, the Coastal Branch splits off from the main California Aqueduct. Buena Vista, Teerink and Chrisman Pumping Plants are located on the main aqueduct near the southern end of the San Joaquin Valley near Bakersfield. The aqueduct then reaches A.D. Edmonston Pumping Plant, which lifts the water  over the Tehachapi Mountains that separate the San Joaquin Valley from Southern California. Initial construction of Edmonston was completed in 1974, with the last three units installed in the 1980s.

Once reaching the crest of the Tehachapis, the aqueduct runs through a series of tunnels to the Tehachapi Afterbay, where its flow is partitioned between West and East Branches.

Coastal Branch
Pumping plants at Las Perillas, Badger Hill, Devil's Den, Bluestone, and Polonio Pass serve to lift the water over the California Coast Ranges. Once over the crest of the mountains, the water is reregulated in a series of small reservoirs numbered Tanks 1 through 5. The Coastal Branch was completed in 1994 following a severe drought that led to calls for importation of SWP water.

Through a pipeline known as the Central Coast Water Authority extension, completed in 1997, the Coastal Branch supplies water to Lake Cachuma, a  reservoir on the Santa Ynez River.

West Branch

From the terminus of the main California Aqueduct at Tehachapi Afterbay, the West Branch carries water to a second reservoir, Quail Lake, via the Oso Pumping Plant. The water then runs south by gravity to the 78 MW William E. Warne Powerplant, located on the  Pyramid Lake reservoir.

From Pyramid Lake, water is released through the Angeles Tunnel to the Castaic Power Plant on Elderberry Forebay and the  Castaic Lake reservoir located north of Santa Clarita. Castaic Power Plant is a pumped-storage hydroelectric plant capable of producing 1,247 MW on peak demand. Together, Pyramid and Castaic Lakes form the primary storage for West Branch water delivered to Southern California. Water is supplied to municipalities in Los Angeles and Ventura counties.

East Branch
The East Branch takes water from Tehachapi Afterbay along the north side of the San Gabriel Mountains and San Bernardino Mountains to the Silverwood Lake reservoir, which can hold . From here it passes through a tunnel under the San Bernardino Mountains to the Devil Canyon Powerplant, the largest "recovery plant", or aqueduct power plant, of the SWP system.

The East Branch principally provides water for cities and farms in the Inland Empire, Orange County, and other areas south of Los Angeles. Through Lake Perris, the Metropolitan Water District of Southern California receives a large portion of its water from the SWP. Water is also supplied to the San Diego Aqueduct through a connection from Perris to Lake Skinner, further south.

Proposed and unbuilt features

North Coast diversions

The original 1957 California Water Plan included provisions for dams on the Klamath, Eel, Mad and Smith Rivers of California's North Coast. The plan was basically a variation of a contemporary Bureau of Reclamation project, the Klamath Diversion.

A series of dams in these watersheds would shunt water through interbasin transfers into the Klamath River system. The centerpiece of the project would be a  reservoir on the Klamath River – the largest man-made lake in California – from where the water would flow through the  Trinity Tunnel into the Sacramento River, and thence to the canals and pump systems of the SWP. The diversion of the North Coast rivers, however were dropped from the initial SWP program.

In the mid-1960s, devastating flooding brought renewed interest in damming the North Coast rivers. The Department of Water Resources formed the State-Federal Interagency Task Force with the Bureau of Reclamation and the Army Corps of Engineers to develop plans for developing the rivers in the name of flood control – which would, incidentally, provide a way to divert some of their water into the SWP system. Although most of the proposed projects met their demise over political squabbles, one that persisted was the Dos Rios Project on the Eel River system, which would have involved constructing a gigantic dam on the Middle Fork of the Eel River, diverting water through the Grindstone Tunnel into the Sacramento Valley. Supporters of this project cited the disastrous Christmas flood of 1964 and the flood control benefits Dos Rios would provide to the Eel River basin.

The Klamath and Dos Rios diversions were heavily opposed by local towns and Native American tribes, whose land would have been flooded under the reservoirs. Fishermen expressed concerns over the impact of the dams on the salmon runs of North Coast rivers, especially the Klamath – the largest Pacific coast salmon river south of the Columbia River. The project would have eliminated 98 percent of the salmon spawning grounds on the Klamath. California Governor Ronald Reagan refused to approve the Dos Rios project, citing economic insensibility and fraudulent claims made by project proponents. The flood control benefits, for example, were largely exaggerated; the Dos Rios dam would have reduced the record  Eel River flood crest of 1964 by only  had it been in place.

In 1980, the North Coast rivers were incorporated into the National Wild and Scenic Rivers system, effectively eliminating the possibility of any projects to divert them.

Peripheral Canal/California WaterFix

Earlier designs called for a Peripheral Canal to skirt the Delta to the east. Supporters of the canal and tunnel have included the Central Valley farmers and the Metropolitan Water District and urban developers in Los Angeles. They claim it would eliminate the need to pull water directly through this sensitive region, reducing salinity intrusion and water quality problems during the dry season. The canal was included in the initial SWP planning, and the lack of the canal is among the principal reasons the SWP has never been able to deliver its full entitlement.

Tunnel opponents believe the construction project would do extensive damage to the sensitive Delta ecosystem, farms and communities. Opponents also believe there will be long-term damage to the Delta ecosystem from fresh water being removed prior to flushing through the Delta and flowing more naturally to the San Francisco Bay.

Governor Jerry Brown had supported a ballot initiative approving the canal in the early 1980s, and stated his intention to finish the project in its tunnel form during his second governorship (2011-2019). His successor, Gavin Newsom, has also supported the project. Supporters of the tunnel argue that water being drawn from the southern intakes creates problems for wildlife and changes the natural flow in these areas, which would be corrected by drawing water from farther north. Supporters also claim that the California levees are also vulnerable to earthquakes and directing water away from them protects the supply of water. Delta farmers, communities, and commercial salmon and bass fishermen are especially concerned about the tunnel. However, some Delta scientists disagree. The new proposed canal would transport  of water to Silicon Valley, southern California and the majority of it would be directed to the Central Valley, a location with political influence and interest in the canal being built.

Sites Reservoir

Since the 1980s, there has been interest in creating a large off-stream reservoir in the Sacramento Valley. Water "skimmed" off high winter flows in the Sacramento River would be pumped into a storage basin in the western side of the valley known as Sites Reservoir. This project has previously arisen in several forms, including proposals for a Glenn Reservoir or the Glenn-Colusa Complex on nearby streams, which would also have been receiving reservoirs for water sent east through the Dos Rios Project's Grindstone Tunnel or other transfers from North Coast rivers.

With its large storage capacity, Sites Reservoir would increase the production and flexibility of California's water management system, yielding  of new water per year. However, the project has been criticized for its high cost, and potential disruption of fish migration when large amounts of water are drawn from the Sacramento River during the wet season.

Los Banos Grandes
The Los Banos Grandes reservoir was first proposed in 1983 and would have served a similar purpose to Sites. The  reservoir would have been located along the California Aqueduct several miles south of San Luis Reservoir, and would have allowed for the storage of water during wet years when extra water could be pumped from the Sacramento–San Joaquin Delta. Pumped-storage hydroelectric plants would have been built between Los Banos Grandes and the existing Los Banos flood control reservoir, and between that reservoir and the aqueduct. The current status of Los Banos Grandes remains uncertain, as the DWR has been unable to appropriate funding since the 1990s.

Modern issues

The existing SWP facilities are collectively known as Stage I. Stage II, which includes such works as the Peripheral Canal and Sites Reservoir, was to have been built beginning in the late 1970s and 1980s – but due to concerted opposition from Northern Californians, environmentalist groups and some economic interests, as well as the state's increasing debt, attempts to begin construction have all met with failure. Parties currently receiving SWP water are also opposed to its expansion, because water rates could be raised up to 300 percent to help pay for the cost. As a result, SWP capacity falls short by an average of  each year; contractors only occasionally receive their full shares of water.

The disparity of costs to the project's various constituents has been a frequent source of controversy. Although the overall average cost of SWP water is $147 per acre-foot ($119 per 1,000 m3), agricultural users pay far less than their urban counterparts for SWP water. The Kern County Water Agency (the second largest SWP entitlement holder) pays around $45–50 per acre-foot ($36–41 per 1,000 m3) of SWP water, which is mostly used for irrigation. The Metropolitan Water District of Southern California (the largest entitlement holder) pays $298 per acre-foot ($241 per 1,000 m3). This basically means that cities are subsidizing the cost of farm water, even though the cities also provided primary funding for the construction of the SWP.

In the early 1970s, the SWP system still had a lot of "surplus" – water supply developed through the construction of Oroville Dam, which was running unused to the Pacific Ocean because the water delivery infrastructure for Southern California had not yet been completed (and when it was, southern California was slow to use the water). The surplus water was given for irrigation in the San Joaquin Valley instead. Because the water would only be a temporary supply, farmers were advised to use it for seasonal crops (such as alfalfa or hay) rather than permanent crops such as orchards. Nevertheless, many farmers used the water to develop new permanent crops, creating a dependency on SWP water that is technically part of Southern California's entitlement, This is now causing tensions as Southern California continues to increase its use of SWP water, decreasing the amount of surplus available to the system, especially in years of drought.

In dry years, water pumped from the Delta creates a hazard to spring-run salmon. As the Banks Pumping Plant pulls water from the Sacramento River southward across the Delta, it disrupts the normal flow direction of east to west that salmon smolt follow to the Pacific Ocean. Populations of salmon and steelhead trout have reached critically low levels in the decades after SWP water withdrawals began. The fish migration issue has become hotly contested in recent years, with rising support for the construction of the Peripheral Canal, which would divert water around the Delta, restoring the natural flow direction.

Water use and environmental problems associated with the SWP led to the creation of the CALFED Bay-Delta Program (CALFED) in 1994. The primary goals are to improve quality of SWP water while preventing further ecological damage in the Sacramento–San Joaquin Delta.

In January 2014, after the moderately dry year of 2012 and the record California drought of 2013, the Department of Water Resources announced that the SWP would be making zero deliveries that year, the first time in the project's history, due to dangerously low snowpack and reservoir levels. On April 18, 2014, the Department of Water  Resources increased the SWP allocation back to five percent and that level remained until the initial allocation for 2015 was give on December 1, 2014.

Project data

Contracting water agencies

Dams and reservoirs
Background color denotes facility shared with Central Valley Project.

*This is the portion of total capacity of San Luis Reservoir allocated to SWP; the total capacity is

Aqueducts

Pump plants

Powerplants

See also
Central Valley Project
Patrick D. McGee (1916–70), California State Assembly member who fought for the State Water Project
Peripheral Canal
Water in California

References

Works cited

Further reading

External links
State Water Project - page at Maven's Notebook
California Department of Water Resources State Water Project overview 
CALFED
State Water Project - Santa Clara Valley
Image of three California State Water Project employees picketing Castaic Reservoir, California, 1972. Los Angeles Times Photographic Archive (Collection 1429). UCLA Library Special Collections, Charles E. Young Research Library, University of California, Los Angeles.

 
Water management authorities in California
Water in California
Interbasin transfer
1960 establishments in California
Government agencies established in 1960
Public utilities established in 1960
Hydroelectric power plants in California